Ameer Aadmi Gareeb Aadmi is a 1985 Hindi drama film, directed by Amjad Khan, starring Shatrughan Sinha, Kader Khan and Zeenat Aman in key roles.

Plot
This is the story of Subhash, a worker in a factory who lives with his small family. Subhash works there with other labours without sufficient wages and they call the strike. The authority entraps him on false charges and police arrest him.

Cast
 Shatrughan Sinha
 Zeenat Aman
 Amitabh Bachchan (cameo)
 Parveen Babi (cameo)
 Kader Khan as Subhash Gayekwad
 Amjad Khan as Akram
 Shakti Kapoor
 Dinesh Hingoo
 Kalpana Iyer
 Sharat Saxena

Soundtrack
"Paas Rehta Hai, Door Rehta Hai, Koi Dil MeJarur Rehta Hai" - Lata Mangeshkar
"Har Ek Rasta Sajake Chal" - Asha Bhosle
"Aisa Kyu Hota Hai" - Asha Bhosle
"Dhak Dhak Dhadke Ye Dil" - Suresh Wadkar, Kavita Krishnamurthy
"Nahi Jaana Kunwarji" - Penaz Masani
"Sarkari Damad Bano" - Amit Kumar, Kishore Kumar

References

External links
 

1985 films
1980s Hindi-language films
Films scored by R. D. Burman
Indian thriller drama films